Admiral Sir Michael Henry Hodges,  (29 September 1874 – 3 November 1951) was a senior Royal Navy officer who went on to be Second Sea Lord and Chief of Naval Personnel.

Naval career
Hodges joined the Royal Navy as a cadet in the training ship HMS Britannia in 1887. In late 1899, during the Second Boer War, he was landed in South Africa as a member of 's naval brigade and sent to defend the town of Ladysmith. He was appointed in command of the destroyer HMS Flirt on 18 September 1900, when she served in the Portsmouth instructional flotilla, and left her on 8 January 1901 to take command of the destroyer HMS Crane, which replaced Flirt in the flotilla. In late September that year, he was appointed to the President for study at the Royal Naval College. He was appointed in command of the cruiser  in 1905 and despatched to South Georgia to investigate the emerging whaling industry there. In 1912 he became Naval Attaché in Paris.

In World War I he commanded the battlecruiser  and then the new battlecruiser . In 1918 he was appointed Chief of Staff to the Second in Command of the Grand Fleet.

After the War he was made Rear Admiral Commanding the Destroyer Flotillas of the Atlantic Fleet. He became Naval Secretary in 1923, Commander of the 3rd Battle Squadron in April 1925 and Commander of the 1st Battle Squadron and Second in Command of the Mediterranean Fleet in March 1926. He was Second Sea Lord and Chief of Naval Personnel from 1927 to 1930 when, having been promoted to full admiral in 1929, he was appointed Commander-in-Chief, Atlantic Fleet in 1930. It was at this time that the Invergordon Mutiny took place when sailors of the Atlantic Fleet rioted over pay although Hodges was in the Royal Hospital Haslar at Gosport and therefore not directly involved in resolving the crisis. He was relieved due to pleurisy and retired in 1932. During World War II he was re-employed as Flag Officer in Charge in Trinidad, West Indies.

In retirement he became Chairman of the Shipwrecked Fishermen and Mariners Royal Benevolent Society.

Family
In 1903 he married Frederica Rika Octavia Tiarks; they went on to have four sons and one daughter.

References

|-

|-

1874 births
1951 deaths
Royal Navy personnel of World War I
Royal Navy personnel of World War II
Graduates of the Royal Naval College, Greenwich
Royal Navy admirals
Knights Commander of the Order of the Bath
Companions of the Order of St Michael and St George
Members of the Royal Victorian Order
Lords of the Admiralty